Karl Leopold Heinrich Ludwig von Borstell (born December 30, 1773, in Tangermünde; d. May 9, 1844 in Berlin) was a Prussian General of the Cavalry and member of the then Prussian State Council.

References

Further reading
Kurt von Priesdorff: Soldatisches Führertum. Band 3, Hanseatische Verlagsanstalt Hamburg, [Hamburg], nd [1937], pp. 383–390, Nr. 1182, DNB 367632780
Richard von Meerheimb: "Borstell, Karl Heinrich Ludwig von". In: Allgemeine Deutsche Biographie (ADB). Band 3, Duncker & Humblot, Leipzig 1876, pp. 181–183
Ernst Demmler: "Borstell, Karl Leopold Georg Ludwig von". In: Neue Deutsche Biographie (NDB). Band 2, Duncker & Humblot, Berlin 1955, p. 478 (online version)
Gerhard Kunze: „Die Saxen sind Bestien“. Die Erschießung von sieben sächsischen Grenadieren bei Lüttich am 6. Mai 1815. BWV – Berliner Wiss.-Verlag, Berlin 2004, 
Wilfried Rogge: Lebensbild des Carl Heinrich Leopold Ludwig von Borstell – Preußischer General der Kavallerie (Ein Altmärker zwischen Held und Befehlsverweigerer), Schinne 2009
Marion Schierz: "Mit Mut und Geschick zum Sieg". In: Berlinische Monatsschrift (Luisenstädtischer Bildungsverein). Heft 9, 1999,  (luise-berlin.de)

1773 births
1844 deaths
Generals of Cavalry (Prussia)
Prussian Army personnel of the Napoleonic Wars
Recipients of the Pour le Mérite (military class)
Recipients of the Iron Cross (1813)